Bellator 281: MVP vs. Storley (also known as  Bellator London) was a mixed martial arts event produced by Bellator MMA that took place on May 13, 2022, at SSE Arena in London, England.

Background 
Yaroslav Amosov was to make his first Welterweight title defense against Michael “Venom” Page in the main event. Amosov won the title in June 2021 at Bellator 260 with a unanimous decision win over Douglas Lima. Since losing to Lima in his first title bout, Page won his next 6 bouts, culminating in him avenging a 2019 knockout loss to Lima via a narrow split-decision at Bellator 267, a fight that also took place in London. Due to the war in Ukraine and Amosov's participation in the war on the side of Ukraine, Amosov pulled out of the bout and was replaced by Logan Storley with the bout now being for the interim Welterweight title.

A welterweight bout between Douglas Lima and Jason Jackson was scheduled for this event. However, due to shoulder injury to Lima, the bout was pulled from the event and will be rescheduled for the future.

A welterweight bout between Andrey Koreshkov and Paul Daley was scheduled for this event. However, due to undisclosed reasons, Koreshkov pulled out of the bout and was replaced by Wendell Giácomo.

At the weigh-ins, Alan Carlos missed weight for his bout, weighing in at 189.2 pounds, 3.2 pounds over the middleweight non-title fight limit. The bout proceeded at catchweight and Carlos was fined a percentage of his purse which went to his opponent Charlie Ward.

Results

See also 

 2022 in Bellator MMA
 List of Bellator MMA events
 List of current Bellator fighters
 Bellator MMA Rankings

References 

Bellator MMA events
2022 in mixed martial arts
2022 in English sport
Mixed martial arts in the United Kingdom
Sports competitions in London
May 2022 sports events in the United Kingdom
2022 sports events in London